Seyyedabad (also Romanized as Seyyedābād) is a village in Akhtachi-ye Gharbi Rural District of the Central District of Mahabad County, West Azerbaijan province, Iran. At the 2006 National Census, its population was 138 in 38 households. The following census in 2011 counted 68 people in 18 households. The latest census in 2016 showed a population of 1,010 people in 287 households; it was the largest village in its rural district.

References 

Mahabad County

Populated places in West Azerbaijan Province

Populated places in Mahabad County